Hovea rosmarinifolia, commonly known as mountain beauty or rosemary hovea  is a shrub in the family Fabaceae, native to Australia. A small shrub bearing attractive blue-purple or mauve pea flowers from August to November.

Description
The stems and branches are thickly covered in brownish coloured soft hairs that may be wrinkled, curly or straight. The leaves are a deep green above, paler on the underside and arch downward on either side of the midrib. The surface is either smooth or sparsely covered in rough hairs with a network of prominent raised veins. The leaf underside has curled or wrinkled brownish hairs completely covering the leaf blade. The mauve keel is shorter than the petals of the flower.

Taxonomy and naming
Hovea rosmarinifolia was first formally described by Allan Cunningham in 1825 and published in Geographical Memoirs of New South Wales. The specific epithet (rosmarinifolia) is derived from the Latin words rosmarinus meaning "rosemary" and folium meaning "leaf".

Distribution and habitat
Rosemary hovea  grows from Lithgow, Cowra and north to Gilgandra in New South Wales.  An understory shrub growing in scrubland or sheltered gullies on poor free draining sandy soils. Also grows in scattered locations in Victoria and the Australian Capital Territory.

Conservation status
Hovea rosmarinifolia is believed to be confined in Victoria to the dry rocky woodlands of Mount Difficult in the Grampians and is classified as "vulnerable" due to its restricted distribution.

References

rosmarinifolia
Fabales of Australia
Plants described in 1837
Taxa named by Allan Cunningham (botanist)